The 1931 Furman Purple Hurricane football team represented Furman University as an independent during the 1931 college football season. Led by fourth-year head coach T. B. Amis, the Purple Hurricane compiled a record of 5–2–2.

Schedule

References

Furman
Furman Paladins football seasons
Furman Purple Hurricane football